Wesley Dening (born 14 July 1983) is an Australian television producer based in Los Angeles. He is the President of an international production company called WD Entertainment Group Inc. and serves as Executive Producer of Eureka Productions series  Santa Monica. Dening is originally from Australia, where he first became known as a host for multiple Australian television programs including Totally Wild, Totally Wild: Antarctica, Ten's First at Five News, Kick2Kick and also as a contestant on Big Brother Australia 2004.

Dening is the Executive  Producer of Holey Moley for ABC, an extreme miniature golf competition series produced by Eureka Productions & Stephen Curry's production company Unanimous Media. Holey Moley won the Realscreen 2020 Award for Best New Format. Dening is also the Executive Producer of Dating Around on Netflix, Crikey! It's the Irwins and spinoff series Crikey! It's The Irwin's Life in Lockdown and Crikey! It's the Irwin's Bindi's Wedding for Animal Planet. Dening is also the Executive Producer of Pick, Flip & Drive for Facebook.

Dening is also an Executive Producer of the upcoming unscripted series The Real Magic Mike for HBO Max, with Channing Tatum and Steven Soderbergh listed as Executive Producers. Dening also Executive Produces Full Bloom for HBO Max and the upcoming The Real Love  Boat for CBS.

Dening has won multiple awards for series he has produced including Realscreen's Format of the Year Award in 2020 for Holey Moley the Critic's Choice Award for Best Relationship Series for Dating Around, and multiple Telly Awards for Pick, Flip & Drive. Holey Moley, Pick, Flip & Drive and Dating Around were also nominated for Content Innovation Awards in Cannes, with Holey Moley also nominated for a Rose D'Or Award for Entertainment Program of the Year.

In the US Dening also received acclaim for his on camera work as the host of Code: 9, a hidden camera prank series for Disney Channel. He was also on-camera as a commentator for US Cable network truTV's series truTV Presents: World's Dumbest.

Early life
He was College Captain at St. Joseph's Nudgee College. During his teen years, Dening was a national-level swimmer, he also worked as an actor and model, even winning Young Model of the Year.  Dening was founder of 'Seriously Pink' a fashion franchise in central Brisbane.

Television
Dening was a contestant on the Australian Big Brother Series 4. He entered the house on Day 1 and was evicted on Day 69, finishing 8th. Dening returned to star in Big Brother 5 as part of an All Star Team that went into the house to compete against current contestants for that season.  After appearing on Big Brother, Dening appeared in radio advertisements for local Brisbane stations 4 BC, B105 and Triple M. In 2005, Dening became an ambassador for Tourism Queensland, for which he helped to raise awareness of the state.

In addition to his work on camera, Dening also traveled Australian as a speaker for the National Young Leaders Day, a bi-annual event held in all 5-major capital cities in Australia. Dening was also an ambassador for Tourism Queensland and an Australian Day Ambassador.

Network TEN
Dening began as a host on Network Ten's Totally Wild in 2004. In 2006 he was the recipient of the Australian Antarctic Arts Fellowship.  In 2007, Dening was a presenter, writer and producer for Totally Wild, as well as the Sports presenter for Ten News Brisbane over the Christmas Holidays. Dening also hosted the national program on Network Ten called Kick2Kick, and hosted two Network Ten documentaries, Spirit of the Outback and Ghosts of the Gulf, and appeared on Rove Live, 9am with David & Kim, and was a guest co-host for Toasted TV and Scope. In 2008 on Channel Ten, Dening served as one of the hosts for the 2008 New Year's Eve telecast.

United States
Dening oversee's development and production for Eureka Productions based in Los Angeles, with series including Holey Moley (ABC), Crikey It's The Irwin's (Animal Planet), Dating Around (Netflix) and Pick, Flip & Drive.

Holey Moley on ABC was a breakout success in the summer of 2019 with the first episode winning the night in the U.S. with a 1.0 rating in the key 18-49 demographic. The Premiere of season 2 was compared lauded by press as "better than the original" and "
". The Season 2 premiere also won its time slot easily on May 21, 2020. In an interview with Reality Blurred Dening referred to his work with 3xNBA Champion Steph Curry as ""Steph's been awesome to work with on season two," and "He's so enthusiastic and passionate about it that we wanted to find a way to have him in every episode—he wanted to be in every episode".

Dening is also been a speaker at the television industry event Realscreen Summit 

In 2009, Dening began appearing on truTV's The Smoking Gun Presents, as one of the many co-hosts. The show is filmed in New York City and Los Angeles. In 2011, Dening was signed to host and star in a series for Disney Channel, titled Code: 9. The show premiered on Disney Channel on 26 July 2012 and will run throughout 2012. Code: 9 will also air in the United Kingdom, Ireland, Australia, Canada, Russia and New Zealand in 2012. Dening was the Executive Producer and creator of Big Crazy Family Adventure  for the Travel Channel.

WDE
Dening is the founder of WD Entertainment Group. Formed in 2010, the production company's first TV-series The Stafford Brothers premiered for Fox8 Australia (6 Episodes). The Stafford Brothers follows the rise of two of Australia's biggest DJ's. The show was considered a huge success in Australia and is now playing across more than 10 countries internationally. Season 2 (10 Episodes) of The Stafford Brothers broadcast on Fox8 in 2012.

In 2014 WDE produced and launched The Flying Winemaker on Discovery Channel TLC. In 2014, WDE produced Big Crazy Family Adventure for the Travel Channel, a 9x1hr series launching in 2015, with Dening as Executive Producer.  WDE's original series continue to broadcast in more than 55 countries.

References

External links

Wesley's Profile on Harrymmiller.com.au
Member Profile - Wes Dening

Big Brother (Australian TV series) contestants
Australian television presenters
Living people
People from Brisbane
1983 births
Place of birth missing (living people)